Aatagara is a 2015 Indian Kannada mystery thriller film directed by K. M. Chaitanya and produced by Dwarakish Chitra in its 49th production. The film has an ensemble cast with 10 main protagonists played by Chiranjeevi Sarja, Meghana Raj, Parul Yadav, Anu Prabhakar, Achyuth Kumar, Prakash Belawadi, Balaji Manohar, Pavana Gowda, Sadhu Kokila, Aarohitha Gowda along with Ananth Nag, P. Ravi Shankar and RJ Nethra in key supporting roles.

The music is composed by Anoop Seelin. The film released on 28 August 2015. The trio of producer Yogish Dwarakish – director Chaitanya – hero Chiranjeevi went on to work again in Aake and Amma I Love You. The movie is based on Bollywood movie Gumnaam which was based on Agatha Christie's 1939 mystery novel And Then There Were None.

Plot
  
Mrutyunjay (Chiranjeevi Sarja) is a drug dealer. He loses drugs which were worth a lot of money. So his boss threatens to kill him if he does not return the amount those drugs cost. He gets into a reality show called 'Aaatagara' hoping to win it and win a lot of money to return to his boss.

He has a crush on Sakshi (Meghana Raj), a famous model. She too is in the show too. Many famous people like an actress Malika (Parul Yadav), a school principal Sandhya (Anu Prabhakar), a famous cook, Sadhu Maharaj (Sadhu Kokila) a journalist, Yashwanth (Kumar), a doctor, Chetan Bhagwat (Prakkash Belwadi), a wildlife worker, Anu, a model photographer, KP and a common woman, Bhavana are participants in the show.

Instructions of the reality show are that they will reach an island an no one can get off the island as there are no means of transportation, until the end of the show. There is a room in which groceries to cook are kept. Only the cook, Sadhu Maharaj is allowed in there. And a service room inside which no one is allowed.

They see a Ravana statue with ten heads.

Unfortunately, the next day on the island many people get killed. Anu, Sadhu, Yashwanth and Bhavana are killed. One telephone was in the house, which was not working. Suddenly, the television starts playing. The host of the 'Aatgara' channel says that they have regained all contact with the island where the players have gone. But, when they introduce the names of the participants, everyone is shocked as all the participants the host of the channel has mentioned are all different from those who are there on this island. Then, they get a phone call saying that all of them will die. They also find out that as each one of them die, one of the Ravana's heads will be cut off. Then, the remaining get to know that everyone was lured into the show.

Family members of these participants are tensed and they file a case against the 'Aatagara' channel. Inspector Ravi Gowda and Sub-Inspector Rohit investigate the case.

Then, when all of them, tired, go to sleep, Jay wakes up and finds that the doctor, Chetan is not in the house. He feels that he has run away and follows him. He loses track of the doctor when he hears gunshots. He doubts if Chetan is the killer. He runs back to the house and convinces everyone that Chetan is the killer and he tried to kill him. They search Chetan's suitcase to see if they can find a gun to break open the control room to communicate with the channel host. They do find one and break open the lock of the control room. There a judge reveals, through a live webcam that all of them have committed crime, but have escaped from the law by showing false proof that they were innocent.

Jay had killed the judge's grandson by supplying lot of drugs to him. Sakshi had killed a small boy by drowning him for being in love with his father. A teacher in Sandhya' school had raped a six-year-old girl. To save the reputation of the school, she used Yashwanth, the journalist to turn the case against the father of the girl and made it looked as if he was the rape culprit. The father, then committed suicide. KP seduced a model for his own good and when she was of no use to him, he said he did not love her, causing her to lose her sanity. Malika got drunk and was driving a car, and by mistake she killed an old couple. She made it look as if her driver was driving the car. She gave the driver some money in turn for falsely confessing that he was driving the car and killed the couple. The judge also reveals that there is a spy on the island. After the webcam switches off, everyone is convinced that Chetan is the killer. KP, Malika and Sandhya are killed. At the same time, the Inspector, Ravi gets a letter from the judge, showing proof that the ones who went to this island were all criminals, but some of them were powerful, so they did not get arrested. Soon after, they leave for the island, even though the judge had told them that none of them are going to be alive even if the police ends up finding them.

Jay and Sakshi go in search of the doctor to kill him as the judge had said that if they would kill the spy, they will have a chance to escape from the island. They find Chetan's dead body and they start doubting each other. Sakshi shoots Jay, a little above his stomach, thinking he is the killer. Jay confesses his love for Sakshi and says that he is not the killer. Sakshi apologizes for shooting him. She sees hallucinations of the boy she killed and apologizing for the crime she committed, she shoots herself.

It is also revealed that Anu was the spy.

Jay is hurt very badly when the police reach. They instantly carry him back and hospitalize him. Ravi, seeing that the judge's intention was good, closes the case and gives Jay a new life of making cotton candies, not allowing him to do any more drug business.

At the end the judge, and the family members of the victims join a laughing club and laugh all that they can, happy, that they had received justice.

Cast

 Chiranjeevi Sarja as Mrutyunjay (Jai), a drug peddler
 Meghana Raj as Sakshi, Supermodel
 Parul Yadav as Mallika, an actress
 Anu Prabhakar as Sandhya Ramagopal, Principal of Rainbow School
 Sadhu Kokila as Sadhu Maharaj, a chef
 Achyuth Kumar as Yashwanth, a journalist
 Prakash Belawadi as Dr. Chetan Bhagawat
 Paavana Gowda as Anu
 Balaji Manohar as Kannan Param "KP", a fashion photographer
 Arohitha Gowda as Bhavana
 P. Ravi Shankar as Inspector Ravi Gowda
 Rohit Padaki as Sub-inspector Rohit
 Muni
 Kari Subbu
 Sundar Raj
 Babu Hirannayya
 Raghavendra M. Singatagere
 Sujith Soman
 Shishir
 Rishi as Siddharth Mayya
 Chandradhar
 Veena Sundar as Hema Bhagawat, Dr. Chetan Bhagawat's wife
 Urmila Biswas
 Niharika
 Uma Hebbar
 RJ Nethra as TV Host Usha
 Dwarakish
 Anant Nag in a cameo appearance as a former judge

Controversy

The movie was accused as a remake of 2011 Tamil movie Aduthathu directed by Thakkali Srinivasan. However, director K. M. Chaitanya cleared the air saying that both the movies were based on Agatha Christie's mystery novel And Then There Were None  which was about ten characters stranded on an uninhabited island. He also claimed that while some characters – Meghana Raj (a model who deliberately lets a child drown), Sadhu Kokila (a cook who has killed his owner) and Prakash Belwadi (a doctor who is always suspicious of others and acts strangely)- were directly based on the characters from the novel, others – Anu Prabhakar (principal of a multicoloured school where a child sex abuse case has been reported), Achyuth Kumar (aggressive TV news anchor who does not allow others to air their views) and Parul Yadav (a reputed cinestar who gets away from a drink & drive hit & run accident case by framing the driver) – were based on real life incidents.
However, questions were raised to similarity between the sudden introduction of the master-mind in the basement of the secret room in both Kannada and Tamil versions in spite of the character being anonymous and not making an appearance in the novel. Similarities were also found in the reality-show backdrop, ten faces of Raavana, the characterisation of the investigating officer and the one traitor among the reality-show participants (none of which were found in the novel). It was also argued that instead of ten faces of Raavana, the team could have tweaked it to Dashavathar with metaphoric reference but did not do so as it was straight away taken from the Tamil movie. At this point of time, the team of Aatagara arranged a special screening of the movie for Thakkali Srinivasan in Bangalore. Srinivasan clarified that it is not a remake of his film. He also praised Aatagara of being an extremely well made film. He also revealed that he had made a serial inspired from Agatha Christe's novel And Then There Were None in 1995. Later he made the film Aduthathu inspired by the same. For both these, Kannan Parameshwaran worked on the story. Kannan also wrote the story and co-wrote the screenplay for Aatagara inspired by the same novel. Srinivasan also said that anything similar is to the novel and not his film. He also said anyone saying the movie a remake were ignorant and calling this movie a remake would be an absolute joke.

Soundtrack
The soundtrack is composed by Anoop Seelin. Initially Seelin composed a total of 4 songs and the film makers reportedly dropped out a song so as to not affect the film's pace. The team reportedly came up with a riddle song which celebrated the legendary artists of Kannada cinema.

Track listing

Reception

Critical response 

A critic from The Times of India scored the film at 4 out of 5 stars and wrote "The script and screenplay deserve applause, as does Anoop Seelin's music, especially for the background score. The twists in the plot are succinct and there isn't one dull moment for the viewer. Sathya Hegde's camerawork is the other pillar of this narrative. Watch this film to be entertained, for it gives the viewers very little to complain about". S Viswanath from Deccan Herald wrote "There are needless build-ups and silly comic interludes, besides inept acting by the entire entourage. Aatagara my pass muster for those going without expectations and are not swayed by the hype surrounding the film". Shashiprasad S M from Deccan Chronicle wrote "Insofar as the plot, of the ten four are suddenly found killed in mysterious circumstances. Soon they realise, the real intention behind the game they have embroiled in it. So who is behind the killings and why, and will anyone survive? Without spoiling the real fun in this revenge game, a highly recommended one for a thrilling experience". A critic from DNA wrote "Ananth Nag, though appearing in a brief role, steals the show with his sterling performance. His narration style and gestures are superb. Ravi Shankar, who is known for playing villain characters in Kannada films, is convincing as a police officer. His dialogue delivery is very good. Sadhu Kokila provides the much needed humour in this suspense flick. Parul Yadav’s performance is not up to the mark but Meghana Raj is okay. Pavani, if she takes her profession seriously, will have a bright future in Sandalwood. She is not only beautiful but also impressive. Achyut Rao and Prakash Belvadi, a theatre artiste-cum-journalist, have provided good support". Shyam Prasad S from Bangalore Mirror wrote  "Production values too maintain a standard and Satya Hegde’s cinematography deserves applause. The story of the film is new for Sandalwood and Aatagara is sure to add new audience to Kannada. Chiranjeevi Sarja is not new to such novel films but most of them were remakes. Aatagara should give confidence to many filmmakers to come up with more such originals".

References

External links
 

2010s romantic thriller films
2010s Kannada-language films
Indian romantic thriller films
Films scored by Anoop Seelin
Films based on And Then There Were None
Films directed by K. M. Chaitanya